Polarcus Limited was an offshore geophysical company operating a fleet of seismic research vessels worldwide.

Background
The company was founded in 2008 in Dubai, UAE. After defaulting on debts, lenders took control of the company in January 2021.[4] Shearwater GeoServices bought six seismic acquisition vessels for $127.5 million and streamers and related seismic equipment formerly owned by Polarcus for $50 million.[4]

The company described itself as having a strong environmental focus that aims to decrease emissions to both sea and air. Polarcus vessels have received high energy efficiency and environmental performance ratings.

Polarcus provided worldwide seismic data acquisition services and Multi-Client library data as well as seismic data imaging to help energy companies find oil and gas reserves offshore.

The company was founded in 2008 in Dubai, UAE. After defaulting on debts, lenders took control of the company in January 2021. Shearwater GeoServices bought six seismic acquisition vessels for $127.5 million and streamers and related seismic equipment formerly owned by Polarcus for $50 million.

See also 
 List of oilfield service companies

Shares 

Polarcus listed its shares on the Oslo Stock Exchange OTC list in 2008, and in 2009 began trading on the Oslo Stock Exchange OSE list, under the ticker PLCS. The company was delisted in 2021.

References 

Companies formerly listed on the Oslo Stock Exchange
Companies based in Dubai
Technology companies established in 2008
Technology companies of the United Arab Emirates
Emirati companies established in 2008